Joël Pourbaix (born June 2, 1958) is a Canadian poet. 
He won the Governor General's Award for French language poetry at the 2015 Governor General's Awards for his collection Le mal du pays est un art oublié.

Life
He has reported for Radio Canada.
He lives in Montreal.

Works
Séquences initiales (1980)
Sous les débris du réel (1985)
Vous oublierez de nous séduire (1986)
Dans les plis de l'écriture (1987)
Passage mexicain (1989)
Le Simple geste d'exister (1989)
Voyages d'un ermite et autres révoltes (1992)
La survie des éblouissements (1994)
On ne naît jamais chez soi (1996)
Les enfants de Mélusine (1999)
Disparaître n'est pas tout (2001)
Labyrinthe 5 (2003)
Les morts de l'infini (2005)
Dictature de la solitude (2008)
Le mal du pays est un art oublié (2014)

References

External links
http://www.litterature.org/recherche/ecrivains/pourbaix-joel-780/

1958 births
20th-century Canadian poets
21st-century Canadian poets
Canadian male poets
Canadian poets in French
Writers from Montreal
Living people
Governor General's Award-winning poets
20th-century Canadian male writers
21st-century Canadian male writers